Bruno Garzena (born 2 February 1933) is a retired Italian professional football player who played as a defender.

Honours
Juventus
 Serie A champion: 1957–58, 1959–60.
 Coppa Italia winner: 1958–59, 1959–60.

External links
 Career summary by playerhistory.com
 

1933 births
Living people
People from Venaria Reale
Italian footballers
Italy international footballers
Serie A players
Serie B players
Juventus F.C. players
U.S. Alessandria Calcio 1912 players
L.R. Vicenza players
Modena F.C. players
S.S.C. Napoli players
A.S.D. Calcio Ivrea players
Association football defenders
Footballers from Piedmont
Sportspeople from the Metropolitan City of Turin